Permarachne is an extinct genus of arachnids containing the single species Permarachne novokshonovi from the Permian (Kungurian) of Russia, found in the Koshelevka Formation near the town of Suksun in Perm Krai. It is closely related to modern spiders but unlike them, it has a long thin tail, similar to its relative Attercopus, it is known from the mostly complete holotype PIN 4909/12. It is about 1 cm in size. It initially was thought to be a spider, but is now thought to form a clade with at least its close relative Attercopus, forming the grouping Uraraneida.

References

Permian arthropods
Prehistoric arachnid genera